The 1972 Pacific typhoon season was an above average season, producing 31 tropical storms, 24 typhoons and 2 intense typhoons. It has no official bounds; it ran year-round in 1972, but most tropical cyclones tend to form in the northwestern Pacific Ocean between June and December. These dates conventionally delimit the period of each year when most tropical cyclones form in the northwestern Pacific Ocean.

The scope of this article is limited to the Pacific Ocean, north of the equator and west of the International Date Line. Storms that form east of the date line and north of the equator are called hurricanes; see 1972 Pacific hurricane season. Tropical Storms formed in the entire west Pacific basin were assigned a name by the Joint Typhoon Warning Center. Tropical depressions in this basin have the "W" suffix added to their number. Tropical depressions that enter or form in the Philippine area of responsibility are assigned a name by PAGASA (the Philippine Atmospheric, Geophysical and Astronomical Services Administration. This can often result in the same storm having two names.

Systems 

A total of 36 tropical depressions formed this year in the Western Pacific, of which 30 became tropical storms. Twenty-two storms reached typhoon intensity, of which two reached super typhoon strength.

Typhoon Kit (Asiang–Biring) 

A tropical disturbance generated by an upper tropospheric low in the mid-Pacific trough moved westward through the Caroline Islands, slowly organizing into Tropical Depression 1W on January 5. The depression quickly strengthened, reaching tropical storm status later that day and becoming a typhoon on the 6th as it neared the Philippines. Kit rapidly intensified on the 6th and 7th to a  typhoon, the strongest ever in January, but its inflow was cut off to the west, weakening the typhoon as it continued westward. Kit hit the eastern Philippines as a  typhoon on January 7, and turned north through the archipelago in response to a break in the subtropical ridge. This brought Kit eastward then southward, where after completing its large loop it dissipated on January 15, just  from its starting location.

This unusual, unexpected, and unseasonably strong typhoon killed 204 people and caused nearly $23 million in damage (1972 USD) in the Philippines. The destruction was mostly due to rains and flooding.

Tropical Depression 02W 

Tropical Depression 02W was a weak system that existed near the equator, doing a loop then traveling eastwards as a disturbance before dissipating.

Typhoon Lola 

The northern hemisphere part of a "cyclone twin" developed into a tropical depression west of Kwajalein on May 29. It headed west and slowly strengthened. As it turned to the northwest and then the north northeast, it reached its maximum intensity on June 5. It continued heading north northeast, steadily weakened, and went extratropical on June 7.

Lola passed close enough to some of the islands in Micronesia to cause damage. Two fishermen were reported missing. Wind and waves caused $18 thousand (1972 USD) in damage to Pohnpei and nearby atolls. They also destroyed the fresh water system, causing a shortage of drinking water. On Pingelap and Mokil, sixty houses were destroyed.

Tropical Storm Nina 

Tropical Storm Nina formed as a disturbance heading westwards. It briefly became a tropical depression south of Guam, but it weakened back to a disturbance as it turned back eastwards. As it traveled eastwards, it reintensified, becoming a tropical storm late on the 3rd while far east-southeast of Guam. It did not last, though, weakening back to a disturbance on the 4th and dissipating on the 5th.

Tropical Storm Mamie 

Tropical Storm Mamie formed as a disturbance over the Philippines. It traveled westwards, becoming a tropical depression over the South China Sea, and then becoming a tropical storm on the 1st. The tropical storm made landfall in Vietnam late on the 3rd. It weakened to a tropical depression over land, and it became non-tropical as it went offshore. The extratropical remnants of Mamie traveled northeastwards along the Chinese coast, finally dissipating over Hokkaido.

Typhoon Ora (Konsing) 

Typhoon Ora, which formed on June 22, crossed the northern Philippines on the 24th and 25th as an  typhoon. It weakened over land, but restrengthened in the South China Sea to a  typhoon before hitting southern China on June 27. An unusual feature about Ora was while crossing the South China Sea, it never featured a wall cloud, even though it had winds of typhoon strength.

Ora caused heavy damage to the Manila area in the Philippines. It killed 131 people, including four who died when a ferry in the Bicol region capsized. In Manila Harbor, several ships were blown ashore. All in all, Ora left 385 thousand people homeless and caused $15 million (1972 USD) in damage.

Tropical Depression Didang

Typhoon Phyllis 

Tropical Storm Phyllis, which formed on July 5, quickly intensified from late on July 9 to early July 11 to a  typhoon. The typhoon turned to the northwest, steadily weakening as it approached Japan. Phyllis struck southeastern Japan on July 15 as a tropical storm, and became extratropical that night.

In Japan, Phyllis caused 3 deaths, more than 300 landslides, and flooded more than 6000 homes. Overall damage was moderate.

Typhoon Rita (Gloring) 

The near-equatorial trough spawned four tropical cyclones on July 5, one of which would become Super Typhoon Rita. Having originated over the open Western Pacific, the depression tracked westward, becoming a tropical storm on July 7 and a typhoon the next day. The typhoon stalled and weakened over the next two days as it headed to the northeast. Rita then turned to the north, where it was able to restrengthen. Typhoon Tess at that time was just located some 800 nm east of Rita. A Fujiwhara interaction took place, forcing Rita executed a large loop from July 21 to July 25. In that loop the Rita caught USS Alamo and USS Juneau as they sought to evade to the south after dropping of US Marines and equipment in Okinawa. Both ships weathered the storm but Alamo sustained minor damage in the plunging seas. After looping and passing Okinawa, she continued to the northwest and began to accelerate as she entered a confluent zone created by a trough over Manchuria and a building ridge over the Sea of Japan. She passed by western South Korea, made landfall at Shidao port, Shandong and then weakened into a tropical storm. Rita entered the Bohai Sea, hit northeastern China, and dissipated over the Yanshan mountain northwest of Peking, China on the night of July 27.

Rita's large size and long life caused heavy rains throughout the areas it hit. Rita and Tropical Storm Susan's presence strengthened the southwest monsoon flow over Luzon, where torrential rains occurring between July 17 and July 21 lead to disastrous flooding which killed 214 and with over $150 million in damage. Near Guam, on July 8, the typhoon caused an Air Force Boeing B-52 to crash into the ocean, killing one member of its six-man crew. The remaining crew members were rescued by a US Navy nuclear attack submarine which surfaced in the roiling seas and literally fished the men out by using a line attached to a periscope and reeling them in as the boat rolled in the seas. In Taiwan, heavy rains caused landslides, one of which derailed a train, killing three. In Korea, eight people were killed, more fifty small vessels were lost, and more than two hundred buildings were destroyed. In the Ryukyu Islands, three people were killed. Crop damage was heavy, numerous boats were sunk, and several highways were blocked by mudslides.

Rita killed 229 people, making it this season's deadliest typhoon.

Typhoon Susan (Edeng) 

A disturbance in the ITCZ became a tropical depression on July 5. It headed northwest over the Philippines. It intensified into a tropical storm almost immediately after entering the South China Sea on July 8. It then turned north, and erratically drifted and looped for four days. On July 11, Susan became a typhoon. On July 14, Susan moved close to the Taiwan Strait. It made landfall on the coast of Fujian province, and dissipated inland on July 15.

Susan caused heavy waves on the western coast of Luzon. Along with Super Typhoon Rita, Susan altered the monsoon winds over the Philippines, which caused flooding that killed 214 people; however, as Rita was primarily responsible for these conditions, the Joint Typhoon Warning Center attributes these deaths to the former system. By itself, Susan killed four people in Taiwan. Typhoon Susan sank the SS Oriental Falcon on 12 July 1972 after it ran aground in South China.

Typhoon Tess 

The same near-equatorial trough that developed Rita also developed Typhoon Tess. Tess, having developed on July 7 near the Marshall Islands, tracked westward, reaching typhoon status on July 12. Over the next two days, as Tess turned to the northwest, it rapidly intensified to a  typhoon. Steadily weakening as it continued northwestward, Tess bent back to the west in response to the building of a high pressure cell over Japan. The Fujiwhara effect between Tess and Rita brought  Typhoon Tess into Japan on July 23. After dissipating over Sea of Japan, Tess continued northward, and merged with a front south of Vladivostok on July 25.

In Japan, Tess caused strong flooding and strong surf. This killed 29 people, with 20 missing. These casualties were mostly swimmers caught in the surf.

Typhoon Viola 

Typhoon Viola (classified as a tropical storm by the JTWC) spent its entire life far offshore. Its precursor disturbance formed south of Wake Island on the 21st, and it traveled westwards then northwards at around 160 degrees west, before turning back eastwards on the 24th and eventually becoming extratropical on the 26th.

Tropical Depression Huaning

Tropical Storm Winnie (Isang) 

Tropical Storm Winnie formed as a disturbance far east of the Philippines. The disturbance did a small loop, then headed northwestwards, intensifying into a tropical storm at midnight on the 30th. It continued, traveling north of the island of Taiwan before making landfall in China on the 1st of August. The storm quickly weakened into a disturbance, which traveled slowly inland before dissipating.

Typhoon Alice 

A tropical disturbance emerged from the ITCZ on July 29 and passed through the Marshalls. It became a tropical depression on July 30 and a tropical storm the next day. It and headed in the direction of Japan. Alice became a typhoon on August 2 and reached its maximum intensity on August 4 while southwest of Marcus. As Alice continued approaching Japan, it steadily weakened. It recurved, brushed Honshu, and went extratropical on August 8. It never made landfall.

Waves generated by Alice's storm surge caused a river to overflow in Iwaki, which affected three hundred houses. No one was killed.

Typhoon Betty (Maring) 

A tropical depression formed near the Caroline Islands on August 8. It passed through the Marianas Islands after becoming a tropical storm. Betty turned to the west and peaked as a super typhoon on August 15. It turned to more to the west northwest, passed over the southern Ryukyus and just north of Taiwan, and made landfall on the coast China on August 17. It rapidly weakened inland, and dissipated the next day.

Betty had minimal effects in the Ryukyu Islands. In the Philippines, it enhanced monsoon rains. This caused flooding, which killed seven people in Ilocos Sur. Four other people were presumed dead after a light aircraft went missing. In Taiwan, rains were heavy. The resulting floods in Sanchong District stranded 300 thousand people, and washed out roads and railways. More than 220 houses were totally destroyed, with at least another 130 badly damaged. Betty killed eighteen people in Taiwan, and twenty-nine overall. The total cost of damage is unknown.

Tropical Depression Lusing

Typhoon Cora 

A disturbance west of Luzon became a tropical depression on August 22. It headed into the South China Sea and strengthened into a tropical storm. As it approached Hainan, it became only the fourth August tropical cyclone to intensify into a typhoon in the South China Sea since 1945. It made landfall on Hainan on August 28, emerged into the Gulf of Tonkin, and made a second landfall north of Haiphong. Cora had dissipated inland by August 29.

No damage was reported, and no one was killed.

Severe Tropical Storm Doris 

Tropical Storm Doris stayed far from land. It formed far north of Wake Island and traveled north, becoming a tropical storm on the 26th, but it became extratropical on the 29th and dissipated shortly thereafter.

Typhoon Elsie 

West of Leyte Gulf, a tropical depression formed on August 30. It intensified into a tropical storm after entering the South China Sea. It strengthened into a typhoon on September 1 and slowed down. It made landfall in northern South Vietnam on September 4. It rapidly weakened inland but kept its identity. It transited the Indochina Peninsula and emerged into the Bay of Bengal on September 7, becoming Tropical Cyclone 24-72 of the 1972 North Indian Ocean cyclone season. Ex-Elsie gradually restrengthened as it crossed the Bay of Bengal. It made landfall on the coast of India on September 10 and rapidly dissipated inland.

While crossing Thailand, Elsie caused heavy flooding. No other impact was reported to the JTWC.

Typhoon Flossie (Nitang) 

Typhoon Flossie formed as a disturbance west of Guam late on the 5th of September. The system intensified into a tropical storm just before landfall on Luzon. The cyclone then traveled slowly across the South China Sea, becoming a low-level typhoon before making landfall in Vietnam on the 16th. It weakened to a tropical depression as it crossed Vietnam, but it reintensified after entering the Bay of Bengal as Tropical Cyclone 25-72.

Tropical Storm Grace (Osang)

Typhoon Helen (Paring) 

Typhoon Helen was the most destructive tropical cyclone to strike Japan during the 1972 Pacific typhoon season. Originating from a tropical disturbance on September 11 near the Northern Mariana Islands, Helen gradually intensified as it moved northwestward. By September 14, it reached typhoon strength and soon turned northeast towards Japan. Accelerating due to a trough over the East China Sea, Helen rapidly approached the country and made landfall near Cape Kushimoto as a Category 3-equivalent typhoon on the Saffir–Simpson hurricane scale. Later that day, a weakened Helen emerged into the Sea of Japan. After merging with an upper-level low, the storm transitioned into an extratropical cyclone on September 19 and was last noted two days later after moving through southern Hokkaido.

A total of 4,213 homes were destroyed and another 146,547 were damaged as a result of flash flooding and landslides. Numerous vessels ran aground due to rough seas associated with the storm, including several thousand ton cargo freighters. In all, 87 fatalities and $102 million in damage was attributed to Typhoon Helen.

Tropical Depression 21W

Typhoon Ida

Tropical Depression Reming

Typhoon Kathy

Typhoon Lorna

Typhoon Marie 

Typhoon Marie formed on October 4 and tracked westwards, while it intensified into a category 4 typhoon. Soon after reaching peak intensity, Marie weakened and turned northward and affected the northern Soviet Union and Japan until it transitioned into an extratropical cyclone on October 16. Marie did not inflict much damage during its 12-day duration.

Typhoon Nancy

Tropical Depression Seniang

Typhoon Olga

Typhoon Pamela (Toyang) 

Typhoon Pamela struck Hong Kong killing one person.

Typhoon Ruby

Typhoon Sally 

On November 30, a low-pressure area formed near Borneo, before moving westwards towards the Gulf Of Thailand and eventually becoming Typhoon Sally. Typhoon Sally made landfall near the Surat Thani province of Thailand and gradually weakened to a remnant low in the Bay of Bengal on December 2, dissipating in the same area.

Typhoon Therese (Undang) 

Typhoon Therese, having developed on November 30, struck the Philippines on December 3. After crossing the islands, the typhoon reached a peak of  winds in the South China Sea, a rare event for December. Therese's intensity fluctuated as it continued westward, and hit eastern South Vietnam on the 9th as a  typhoon. Therese dissipated on the 12th, after causing 90 deaths and extensive damage on its path.

Severe Tropical Storm Violet

Storm names 

During the season 29 named tropical cyclones developed in the Western Pacific and were named by the Joint Typhoon Warning Center, when it was determined that they had become tropical storms. These names were contributed to a revised list from late 1950.

Two Central Pacific system developed, Tropical Storms June and Ruby. The naming policy at the time was to use Western Pacific names the Central Pacific.

Philippines 

The Philippine Atmospheric, Geophysical and Astronomical Services Administration uses its own naming scheme for tropical cyclones in their area of responsibility. PAGASA assigns names to tropical depressions that form within their area of responsibility and any tropical cyclone that might move into their area of responsibility. Should the list of names for a given year prove to be insufficient, names are taken from an auxiliary list, the first 6 of which are published each year before the season starts. Names not retired from this list will be used again in the 1976 season. This is the same list used for the 1968 season. PAGASA uses its own naming scheme that starts in the Filipino alphabet, with names of Filipino female names ending with "ng" (A, B, K, D, etc.).

Season effects 
This table will list all the storms that developed in the northwestern Pacific Ocean west of the International Date Line and north of the equator during 1972. It will include their intensity, duration, name, areas affected, deaths, missing persons (in parentheses), and damage totals. Classification and intensity values will be based on estimations conducted by the JMA, however due to lack of information around this time sustained winds were recorded by the JTWC. All damage figures will be in 1972 USD. Damages and deaths from a storm will include when the storm was a precursor wave or an extratropical low.

|-
| Kit (Asiang-Biring) ||  || bgcolor=#| || bgcolor=#| || bgcolor=#| || Palau, Philippines ||  ||  ||
|-
| TD ||  || bgcolor=#| || bgcolor=#| || bgcolor=#| || None ||  None ||  None ||
|-
| TD ||  || bgcolor=#| || bgcolor=#| || bgcolor=#| || Palau, Mariana Islands ||  None ||  None ||
|-
| TD ||  || bgcolor=#| || bgcolor=#| || bgcolor=#| || None ||  None ||  None ||
|-
| TD ||  || bgcolor=#| || bgcolor=#| || bgcolor=#| || Mariana Islands ||  None ||  None ||
|-
| 02W ||  || bgcolor=#| || bgcolor=#| || bgcolor=#| || None ||  None ||  None ||
|-
| TD ||  || bgcolor=#| || bgcolor=#| || bgcolor=#| || None ||  None ||  None ||
|-
| TD ||  || bgcolor=#| || bgcolor=#| || bgcolor=#| || Mariana Islands ||  None ||  None ||
|-
| Lola ||  || bgcolor=#| || bgcolor=#| || bgcolor=#| || Caroline Islands ||  || None ||
|-
| Nina ||  || bgcolor=#| || bgcolor=#| || bgcolor=#| || Caroline Islands ||  None ||  None ||
|-
| Mamie ||  || bgcolor=#| || bgcolor=#| || bgcolor=#| || Vietnam, South China ||  None ||  None ||
|-
| TD ||  || bgcolor=#| || bgcolor=#| || bgcolor=#| || None ||  None ||  None ||
|-
| TD ||  || bgcolor=#| || bgcolor=#| || bgcolor=#| || South China, Taiwan, Ryukyu Islands ||  None ||  None ||
|-
| TD ||  || bgcolor=#| || bgcolor=#| || bgcolor=#| || None ||  None ||  None ||
|-
| Ora (Konsing) ||  || bgcolor=#| || bgcolor=#| || bgcolor=#| || Philippines, South China ||  ||  ||
|-
| Didang ||  || bgcolor=#| || bgcolor=#| || bgcolor=#| || None ||  None ||  None ||
|-
| Phyllis ||  || bgcolor=#| || bgcolor=#| || bgcolor=#| || Japan || Unknown ||  ||
|-
| Rita (Gloring) ||  || bgcolor=#| || bgcolor=#| || bgcolor=#| || Caroline Islands, Ryukyu Islands, South China ||  ||  ||
|-
| Susan (Edeng) ||  || bgcolor=#| || bgcolor=#| || bgcolor=#| || Philippines, Taiwan, China || Unknown ||  ||
|-
| Tess ||  || bgcolor=#| || bgcolor=#| || bgcolor=#| || Japan, Korean Peninsula || Unknown ||  ||
|-
| Viola ||  || bgcolor=#| || bgcolor=#| || bgcolor=#| || None || None || None ||
|-
| Eleven ||  || bgcolor=#| || bgcolor=#| || bgcolor=#| || None ||  None ||  None ||
|-
| TD ||  || bgcolor=#| || bgcolor=#| || bgcolor=#| || None ||  None ||  None ||
|-
| Alice ||  || bgcolor=#| || bgcolor=#| || bgcolor=#| || Japan || None || None ||
|-
| Winnie (Isang) ||  || bgcolor=#| || bgcolor=#| || bgcolor=#| || Taiwan, Ryukyu Islands, East China ||  None ||  None ||
|-
| Huaning ||  || bgcolor=#| || bgcolor=#| || bgcolor=#| || Taiwan ||  None ||  None ||
|-
| TD ||  || bgcolor=#| || bgcolor=#| || bgcolor=#| || South China ||  None ||  None ||
|-
| TD ||  || bgcolor=#| || bgcolor=#| || bgcolor=#| || Mariana Islands ||  None ||  None ||
|-
| Betty (Maring) ||  || bgcolor=#| || bgcolor=#| || bgcolor=#| || Mariana Islands, Taiwan, Ryukyu Islands, East China || Unknown ||  ||
|-
| Lusing ||  || bgcolor=#| || bgcolor=#| || bgcolor=#| || None ||  None ||  None ||
|-
| TD ||  || bgcolor=#| || bgcolor=#| || bgcolor=#| || Philippines ||  None ||  None ||
|-
| TD ||  || bgcolor=#| || bgcolor=#| || bgcolor=#| || None ||  None ||  None ||
|-
| TD ||  || bgcolor=#| || bgcolor=#| || bgcolor=#| || Mariana Islands ||  None ||  None ||
|-
| Celeste ||  || bgcolor=#| || bgcolor=#| || bgcolor=#| || Wake Island ||  None ||  None ||
|-
| Cora ||  || bgcolor=#| || bgcolor=#| || bgcolor=#| || Philippines, South China || Unknown || None ||
|-
| Doris ||  || bgcolor=#| || bgcolor=#| || bgcolor=#| || None || None || None ||
|-
| Elsie ||  || bgcolor=#| || bgcolor=#| || bgcolor=#| || Indochina || Unknown || None ||
|-
| TD ||  || bgcolor=#| || bgcolor=#| || bgcolor=#| || Ryukyu Islands, Japan ||  None ||  None ||
|-
| TD ||  || bgcolor=#| || bgcolor=#| || bgcolor=#| || None ||  None ||  None ||
|-
| TD ||  || bgcolor=#| || bgcolor=#| || bgcolor=#| || Ryukyu Islands||  None ||  None ||
|-
| Flossie (Nitang) ||  || bgcolor=#| || bgcolor=#| || bgcolor=#| || Philippines, Indochina || Unknown || None ||
|-
| TD ||  || bgcolor=#| || bgcolor=#| || bgcolor=#| || Caroline Islands ||  None ||  None ||
|-
| Helen (Paring) ||  || bgcolor=#| || bgcolor=#| || bgcolor=#| || Japan ||  ||  ||
|-
| Grace (Osang) ||  || bgcolor=#| || bgcolor=#| || bgcolor=#| || Philippines ||  None ||  None ||
|-
| 21W ||  || bgcolor=#| || bgcolor=#| || bgcolor=#| || Caroline Islands ||  None ||  None ||
|-
| TD ||  || bgcolor=#| || bgcolor=#| || bgcolor=#| || Caroline Islands ||  None ||  None ||
|-
| Reming ||  || bgcolor=#| || bgcolor=#| || bgcolor=#| || Philippines ||  None ||  None ||
|-
| Ida ||  || bgcolor=#| || bgcolor=#| || bgcolor=#| || None || None || None ||
|-
| Lorna ||  || bgcolor=#| || bgcolor=#| || bgcolor=#| || South China, Vietnam || None || None ||
|-
| Kathy ||  || bgcolor=#| || bgcolor=#| || bgcolor=#| || None || None || None ||
|-
| Marie ||  || bgcolor=#| || bgcolor=#| || bgcolor=#| || None || None || None ||
|-
| TD ||  || bgcolor=#| || bgcolor=#| || bgcolor=#| || None ||  None ||  None ||
|-
| Seniang ||  || bgcolor=#| || bgcolor=#| || bgcolor=#| || Palau, Philippines ||  None ||  None ||
|-
| Nancy ||  || bgcolor=#| || bgcolor=#| || bgcolor=#| || None || None || None ||
|-
| Olga ||  || bgcolor=#| || bgcolor=#| || bgcolor=#| || Marshall Islands, Mariana Islands || None || None ||
|-
| TD ||  || bgcolor=#| || bgcolor=#| || bgcolor=#| || Philippines ||  None ||  None ||
|-
| TD ||  || bgcolor=#| || bgcolor=#| || bgcolor=#| || None ||  None ||  None ||
|-
| Pamela (Toyang) ||  || bgcolor=#| || bgcolor=#| || bgcolor=#| || Philippines, South China || Unknown ||  ||
|-
| Ruby ||  || bgcolor=#| || bgcolor=#| || bgcolor=#| || None || None || None ||
|-
| TD ||  || bgcolor=#| || bgcolor=#| || bgcolor=#| || Caroline Islands ||  None ||  None ||
|-
| Sally ||  || bgcolor=#| || bgcolor=#| || bgcolor=#| || Thailand || Unknown || Unknown ||
|-
| Therese (Undang) ||  || bgcolor=#| || bgcolor=#| || bgcolor=#| || Philippines, Vietnam || Unknown ||  ||
|-
| Violet ||  || bgcolor=#| || bgcolor=#| || bgcolor=#| || Marshall Islands || None || None ||
|-

See also 

 1972 Pacific hurricane season
 1972 Atlantic hurricane season
 1972 North Indian Ocean cyclone season
 Australian cyclone seasons: 1971–72, 1972–73
 South Pacific cyclone seasons: 1971–72, 1972–73
 South-West Indian Ocean cyclone seasons: 1971–72, 1972–73

References

External links 
 Japan Meteorological Agency
 Joint Typhoon Warning Center .
 China Meteorological Agency
 National Weather Service Guam
 Hong Kong Observatory
 Macau Meteorological Geophysical Services
 Korea Meteorological Agency
 Philippine Atmospheric, Geophysical and Astronomical Services Administration
 Taiwan Central Weather Bureau
 Digital Typhoon - Typhoon Images and Information
 Typhoon2000 Philippine typhoon website